The Malonate:Na+ Symporter (MSS) Family (TC# 2.A.70) is a group of transport proteins belonging to the CPA superfamily. These proteins are composites with constituents ranging in size from 129 to 255 amino acyl residues (aas) and exhibiting 4 to 7 transmembrane segments (TMSs). A representative list of proteins belonging to the MSS family can be found in the Transporter Classification Database.

MadLM 

One constituent member of the MSS family, the monobasic malonate:Na+ symporter of Malonomonas rubra, has been functionally and genetically characterized. It consists of two integral membrane proteins, MadL (129 aas; accession number O06931) and MadM (255 aas; accession number O06932) which exhibit 4 and 7 putative transmembrane spanners, respectively. The transporter is believed to catalyze the electroneutral reversible uptake of H+-malonate with one Na+, and both subunits have been shown to be essential for activity. There is a close two-subunit homologue in Pseudomonas putida, which is encoded within the malonate decarboxylase gene cluster of this organism. The NapA Na+/H+ antiporter of Enterococcus hirae (CPA2 family; TC #2.A.37) also appears to be distantly related to MadM.

The transport reaction catalyzed by MadLM is:H+ malonate (out) + Na+ (out) ⇌ H+ malonate (in) + Na+ (in).

See also 
 Transporter Classification Database

Further reading 
 EMBL-EBI, InterPro. "Malonate/sodium symporter MadM subunit, N-terminal (IPR018402) < InterPro < EMBL-EBI". www.ebi.ac.uk. Retrieved 2016-04-06.
 Schaffitzel, C.; Berg, M.; Dimroth, P.; Pos, K. M. (1998-05-01). "Identification of an Na+-dependent malonate transporter of Malonomonas rubra and its dependence on two separate genes". Journal of Bacteriology 180 (10): 2689–2693. ISSN 0021-9193.PMC 107221. PMID 9573154.

References 

Protein families
Membrane proteins
Transmembrane proteins
Transmembrane transporters
Transport proteins
Integral membrane proteins